Aksel-Otto Bull (born 22 February 1963) is a Norwegian theatre director.

He is born in Oslo. He worked as a stage director at Nova Teater from 1984 to 1985, and has later worked for Nordland Teater, Agder Teater and Den Nationale Scene. He was artistical director at Den Nationale Scene in 1997.

References

1963 births
Living people
Norwegian theatre directors
Theatre people from Oslo